The Rotax 535 is an Austrian aircraft engine, that was designed and produced by Rotax of Gunskirchen for use in motor gliders.

The first application for type certification to JAR 22, Appendix H, was made on 29 June 1982 and the first certification was granted on 27 April 1983. It is out of production and is no longer offered for sale by Rotax.

Design and development
The Rotax 535 is a twin cylinder two-stroke, in-line,  displacement, liquid-cooled, gasoline engine design, with a 3:1 belt reduction drive. It runs on 96 octane automotive gasoline or 100LL avgas. Lubrication is 50:1 super two stroke oil premixed with the fuel.

Variants
535A
Equipped with twin Tillotson HR or Mikuni BN 38 diaphragm carburetors and a Mikuni DF 44 diaphragm fuel pump. Produces  at 7200 rpm. First certified on 27 April 1983.
535B
Equipped with twin Tillotson HR or Mikuni BN 38 diaphragm carburetors and a Mikuni DF 44 diaphragm fuel pump. Produces  at 7200 rpm. First certified on 27 April 1983.
535C
Equipped with  one Mikuni BN 38 diaphragm carburetor and a Mikuni DF 44 diaphragm fuel pump. Produces  at 7200 rpm. First certified on 12 June 1987.

Applications
Glaser-Dirks DG-500M
Rolladen-Schneider LS9 - prototype
Schempp-Hirth Janus
Schempp-Hirth Nimbus-4
Schleicher ASH 25

Specifications (535A)

See also

References

External links
Photo of a Rotax 535 engine

Rotax engines
Two-stroke aircraft piston engines
Air-cooled aircraft piston engines
1980s aircraft piston engines